Edenton may refer to:

Places
Edenton, North Carolina, a town in Chowan County
Edenton, Ohio, an unincorporated community in Clermont County

Ships
SS Edenton, a steel-hulled cargo ship built in 1918
USS Edenton, multiple